The Whangaparaoa Peninsula is a suburban area about 25 km north of Auckland, New Zealand. It had 30,672 residents in 2013, many of them in the eponymous town of Whangaparaoa on its southern side. It is part of the Hibiscus Coast. The area is populated largely by retired Aucklanders and “weekenders” who may swell the numbers to many thousands in the holiday season. However, many residents commute from this area to the Auckland CBD for work both via the Gulf Harbour ferry and the Hibiscus Coast Bus Station.

History

The Kawerau hapū Ngāti Kahu traditionally inhabited the peninsula, prior to the arrival of Europeans. Ngāti Kahu's major focuses of settlement were around Te Haruhi Bay and Army Bay. A waka portage existed between Tindalls Beach and Matakatia, allowing travellers to bypass the Whangaparaoa Peninsula, who otherwise would have needed to travel around the entire peninsula.

Whangaparaoa Peninsula was purchased by the government in 1853, after which settlers began developing the land for grazing. Ngāti Kahu continued to live on the land until the 1890s. The Shakespear family acquired many of the landholdings, and farmed the area until 1967, when they sold their land to the Auckland Regional Council, who established the Shakespear Regional Park at the far end of the peninsula.

Geography
The peninsula is in the northern North Island, close to the base of the North Auckland Peninsula. The Māori language name  means "Bay of Whales", and pods of orca and dolphin are regularly spotted in the waters off the peninsula.  The peninsula is mostly urbanised and is in the Northern Auckland Zone of the Auckland urban area, as defined by Statistics New Zealand. Since 2010, it has been part of the Albany Ward and the Hibiscus and Bays Local Board of the Auckland Region.

Until relatively recently a sparsely inhabited rural area, the city lying 25 kilometres to the south. The suburb of Gulf Harbour, four kilometres from the tip of the peninsula where the Gulf Harbour Country Club is located is one of the last suburbs to be developed and is quickly increasing in population.

Auckland's Northern Motorway (State Highway One) was extended to Orewa at the end of the 1990s, reducing journey time into the city and making it more popular for commuters. The under construction Penlink road (including a bridge over the Weiti River from Stanmore Bay to Stillwater) will provide a quicker route between the peninsula and central Auckland.

The peninsula stretches east for 11 kilometres into the Hauraki Gulf, to the north of East Coast Bays. Tiritiri Matangi Island is three kilometres off its eastern tip. 

Communities include Red Beach, Stanmore Bay, Manly, Tindalls Beach, Army Bay, Gulf Harbour, Matakatia, and Arkles Bay. At the end of the peninsula is Shakespear Regional Park.

The New Zealand Defence Force owns part of this area. The base has been used as a resettlement camp for refugees, such as in 2001 when 130 refugees lived there.  it was being used to quarantine New Zealanders who left Wuhan, China during the COVID-19 pandemic.

Economy

Whangaparāoa Town Centre and Coast Plaza 
In the past twenty years the township has developed on the high land above Stanmore Bay, including a shopping centre (Coast Plaza), a movie theatre, a bowling alley, a library and community centre. 

Coast Plaza has 350 carparks, a recently developed food precinct and is anchored by Countdown.

Stanmore Bay Shopping Complex 
The Stanmore Bay shopping complex opened in 2015, replacing the previous complex. The new centre includes 16 retail spaces and is anchored by New World When completed, the Stanmore Shopping complex will mark the end of the Penlink motorway connection.

Manly Village 
The Manly Village is home to many of the coast's restaurants and shops. Plans were lodged for upgrades to part of the complex in 2017 which would have increased retail spaces and added more apartments but have not progressed.

Gulf Harbour Marina 
Opening in the late 1980s the Gulf Harbour Marina is home to a variety of boat maintenance services, and retail. The marina provides for vessels up to 55 metres and has in excess of 1050 berths.

Climate 

Whangaparāoa is a warm temperate oceanic climate (Cfb) on the Köppen Climate Classification System.

Sport
The peninsula is home to the Silverdale Seahawks rugby union and also Hibiscus Coast Raiders rugby league, that are a part of Auckland Rugby League and compete in the Fox Memorial Championship. The peninsula is also home to football (soccer) club Hibiscus Coast AFC, which competes in the Lotto Sport Italia NRFL Division 2.

Transportation
Hibiscus Coast is served by Auckland Transport bus routes operated by AT Metro to destinations including Hibiscus Coast Bus Station and central Auckland. Commuter ferries operated by Auckland Transport and Fullers360 run between Gulf Harbour and central Auckland on week days. Tourism services operate from Auckland City via Gulf Harbour to Tiritiri Matangi Island on select days.

Education
Whangaparaoa College is the main college. It was formed from Hibiscus Coast Intermediate School in 2005, and first had all years 7 to 13 attending in 2009.
Other schools:
Wentworth College and Primary (Gulf Harbour)
Whangaparaoa Primary
Stanmore Bay Primary
Gulf Harbour School   
Red Beach Primary
Orewa College
KingsWay School

See also
Shakespear Regional Park
Gulf Harbour
Whangaparāoa (New Zealand electorate)

References

Hibiscus Coast
Hibiscus and Bays Local Board Area
Peninsulas of the Auckland Region